The world record for the 60 metres hurdles is recognised by World Athletics, the governing body for the sport of athletics, for both men and women. The event is recognised in indoor settings only. The current men's record is 7.29 seconds, set by the USA's Grant Holloway on 24 February 2021 in Madrid, Spain. The current women's record is held by Sweden's Susanna Kallur, with 7.68 seconds set in Karlsruhe, Germany on 10 February 2008.

The governing body have officially ratified world indoor records since 1 January 1987. Previous to this, they were regarded as world indoor bests; as such, the existing world indoor bests were deemed to be the inaugural world indoor records.

Men

Women

References 

World Records. World Athletics. Retrieved 2020-09-11.
60 Metres Hurdles World Record Progression. IAAF Statistics Handbook, Sopot 2014. IAAF (2014). pp. 295, 340-41.

60 metres hurdles
Sprint hurdles